Pukapukan is a Polynesian language that developed in isolation on the island of Pukapuka in the northern group of the Cook Islands. As a "Samoic Outlier" language with strong links to western Polynesia, Pukapukan is not closely related to any other languages of the Cook Islands, but does manifest substantial borrowing from some East Polynesian source in antiquity.

Recent research suggests that the languages of Pukapuka, Tokelau and Tuvalu group together as a cluster, and as such had significant influence on several of the Polynesian Outliers, such as Tikopia and Anuta, Pileni, Sikaiana (all in the Solomon Islands) and the Takuu Atoll in Papua New Guinea. There is also evidence that Pukapuka had prehistoric contact with Micronesia, as there are quite a number of words in Pukapukan that appear to be borrowings from Kiribati (K. & M. Salisbury conference paper, 2013).

Pukapukan is also known as "te leo Wale" ('the language of Home') in reference to the name of the northern islet where the people live. The atoll population has declined from some 750 in the early 1990s to less than 500 since the cyclone in 2005. Literacy in the Pukapukan language was introduced in the school in the 1980s, resulting in an improvement in the quality of education on the atoll.

The majority of those speaking the language live in a number of migrant communities in New Zealand and Australia. A bilingual dictionary was started by the school teachers on the island and completed in Auckland within the Pukapukan community there. An indepth study of the language has resulted in a reference grammar (Mary Salisbury, A Grammar of Pukapukan, University of Auckland, 2003 700pp.).
The most significant publication in the Pukapuka language will be the "Puka Yā" (Bible), with the New Testament expected to be completed for publishing in 2019.

History
Pukapukan is the language spoken on the coral atoll of Pukapuka, located in the northern section of the Cook Islands (Beaglehole 1906–1965). Pukapukan shares minor intelligibility with its national language of Cook Islands Maori, and bears strong links to its neighboring Western Polynesian cultures specifically Samoa.
The island of Pukapuka is one of the most remote islands in the Cook Islands. There is evidence that humans have inhabited the atoll for about 2000 years, but it is not clear whether it has been continuously inhabited. It may be certain that a final settlement took place around 1300 AD from Western Polynesia. Local oral tradition records that huge waves generated by a severe cyclone washed over the island and killed most of the inhabitants except for 15–17 men, 2 women and an unknown number of children. Recent interpretation of genealogies suggests that this catastrophe occurred about 1700 AD. It was from these survivors that the island was repopulated.

The island was one of the first of the Cook Islands to be discovered by the Europeans, on Sunday 20 August 1595 by the Spanish Explorer Álvaro de Mendaña.

Population
The language of Pukapukan is not only spoken on the island of Pukapuka but on the neighboring Cook Islands as well as New Zealand and Australia. Today the population of Pukapuka has diminished with only a few hundred native speakers. From a 2001 census there were only about 644 speakers on Pukapuka and its plantation island of Nassau. As of a 2011 census, there are now only 450 speakers due to a devastating cyclone that hit the island of Pukapuka in 2005. There are a total of 2,400 speakers worldwide, including those who live on Pukapuka and the 200 speakers on Rarotonga, the most populous island of the Cook Islands.

Classification
Pukapukan is an Austronesian language of the Nuclear Polynesian branch. Though grouped with the Cook Islands the language shows influence from both Eastern and Western Polynesia.

Phonology

Alphabet
There are 15 letters in the Pukapukan alphabet – five vowels and 10 consonants. The digraph  occurs in the place that  occupies in the English alphabet.

Consonants
The consonant phonemes in Pukapukan are:  (Teingoa 1993).

The semivowel  and the palatalised dental spirant , in general, regularly reflect  *f and *s, respectively. The  sound in Pukapukan actually acts somewhat differently and is difficult for non native speakers to pronounce. It is pronounced like  in English "this, other".

, go
, new
, woman
, fall over
, nose
, one

Vowels
All vowels have two sounds, a long sound and a short sound. A vowel's length is indicated by writing a macron above each vowel.

, rock
, European
, father
, crewcut (hairstyle)

In Pukapukan it is safe to say that every syllable ends with a vowel, every vowel is pronounced, and there are no diphthongal sounds.

Grammar

Basic word order
Pukapukan uses the two distinctive word orders of verb-subject-object and Verb-Object-Subject, although it is clear that VSO is used more commonly. Adjectives always follow their nouns in Pukapukan. Waka- is often used as a causative prefix in Austronesian languages, but in Pukapukan it has various functionalities. Due to Rarotongan influence ‘waka-’ is shortened to ‘aka-’, whereas ‘waka-’ is seen to be more formal (Teingoa 1993).
Nouns prefixed by waka- become verbs with similar meanings:
au, peace; waka-au, to make peace
lā, sun; waka-lā, to put in the sun to dry
ela; wedge; wakaela, to wedge

Adjectives prefixed by waka become transitive verbs:
yako, straight; waka-yako, to straighten
kokoi, sharp; waka-kokoi, to sharpen

Some verbs prefixed by waka- have specialized meanings that become somewhat difficult to predict from the base meaning.
yā, sacred; waka-yā, to observe as sacred
pono, to be sure; waka-pono, to decide to finalize

Reduplication
Like many other Polynesian languages, Pukapukan uses a lot of full and partial reduplication, some times to emphasize a word or to give it new meaning.
kale, wave/surf; kale-le, undertow of the sea (waves coming in and others receding)
kapa, to clap hands in rhythm; kapa-kapa, to flutter

Numerals
 tayi “one”
 lua “two”
 tolu “three”
 wa “four”
 lima “five”
 ono “six”
 witu “seven”
 valu “eight”
 iva “nine”
 katoa/laungaulu “ten”

Pukapukan uses two different counting systems in the language; the ‘one unit’ and the ‘two unit’. Numeral classifiers are also used as prefixes for numbers over ten and different objects.
The ‘one unit’ uses its word for ten ‘laungaulu’ and adds the ‘one unit’ number (Teingoa 1993).
18 – laungaulu ma valu (ten and eight)

For numbers above nineteen the single unit numbers are used.
30 – lau tolu (two three)
40 – lau wa (two four)

The ‘two unit’ is derived from the ‘one unit’.

Demonstratives and Spatial Deictics

Different form classes

Demonstrative pronouns 
Much like other Oceanic languages, Pukapukan has a three-way distinction of positional demonstrative particles that relate to the position of the speaker and addressee. In Pukapukan, these include nei ‘near to the speaker,’ nā ‘near to addressee and lā ‘away from both the speaker and addressee.’ Pukapukan also has the demonstrative particle ia meaning ‘aforementioned.’  These demonstrative particles form compounds with the singular articles te and e and with the preposition ki ‘to.’ 

The definite demonstrative pronouns are formed by adding the singular specific article te-. For example, when adding te-, nei becomes tēnei ‘this (by me),’ nā becomes tēnā ‘that (by you),’ lā becomes tēlā ‘that (over there)’ and ia becomes teia ‘this (being demonstrated or mentioned previously).’ These demonstrative pronouns only occur as subjects of nominal predicates and as represented below can be equated with personal pronouns (example 1), pronouns (examples 2–3) or definite common noun phrases (examples 4–5).

The demonstrative subject may separate the head from the possessive phase when the nominal predicate is a complex phrase whose head is modified by a postposed possessive phrase, as shown in example 6 below.

The nonspecific article e and the positional demonstrative particles can also be combined to form indefinite demonstrative pronouns. These include ēnāi ‘this (by me),’ ēnā ‘that (by you),’ ēlā ‘that (over there)’ and eia ‘here with (being demonstrated).’ These demonstrative pronouns constitute the nucleus of indefinite nominal predicates and are normally followed by their subjects as shown in examples 7–10 below.

The demonstrative particles can also form compounds with the preposition ki- ‘to.’ These compounds can be used as a substitute (pro-form) for locational nouns. These type of demonstrative pronouns in Pukapukan include, kinea ‘to here,’ kinā ‘to there, by you,’ kilā ‘to over there’ and kiai ‘to there,’ in which kiai is an anaphoric form.

These demonstrative pronouns occur as the head of a locative predicate as demonstrated in examples 11–13 below.

The compound kiai is formed by joining the case marker ki (meaning ‘to’) to the anaphoric pronoun ai. Kiai may replace a personal pronoun or a proper locational noun. This can be seen in example 13 in which the locational noun wale ‘home’ is replaced with kiai in the following constituent.

These forms can also be used to substitute a noun phrase which has been marked for case by a preposition. For example:

Demonstrative modifiers 
Pukapukan has several classes of modifiers. In particular, the directional and positional modifiers help indicate spatial and temporal directions and positions from the speaker and/or addressee.

According to Clark (1976), cognates of the directional particles of Pukapukan are found in all Polynesian languages.

The directional particles tend to modify verbs more frequently than nouns and are often associated with verbs that denote movement, as well as verbs that denote speech, perception, cognition and social interaction.

Mai indicates real or implied movement in the direction of the speaker, for example:

Atu can indicate physical movement away from the speaker, as in:

and for verbs of perception and communication can also indicate direction away from the deictic centre, for example:

Atu can also encode temporal progression away from the present.

Mai and atu can co-occur when modifying the same verb, when one has a directional meaning and the other has a temporal or aspectual meaning.

Ake mostly functions as a politeness marker, but the directional particle ake now has meanings 'upwards' and 'oblique to speaker,' which appears to be a one-particle combination of Proto-Polynesian's hake 'upwards' and aŋe 'oblique to speaker.' Hence, it can function similar to atu and mai in term of denoting temporal and aspectual meanings. However, these forms are rarely used in present day.

In saying that, io is found to be used even less. Reflexes of its Proto-Polynesian form have traditionally been glossed 'downwards,' but this meaning is hardly apparent in Pukapukan and is more often associated with meaning 'misfortune coming upon one.'

The positional modifiers indicate location in space or time relative to the speaker or to the deictic centre of the discourse.

Nei 'near to speaker' can modify a noun in a noun phrase or a locative phrase. Doing so indicates that the entity encoded by the noun is within sight of or in the general locality of the speaker. For instance, in example 21 below, the speaker is likely pointing to a 'word' near them while asking the question.

Nā 'near to addressee' only occurs in noun phrases and can denote a position near to the addressee (example 22), something belonging to the addressee or a characteristic behavior pattern or inherent quality of the addressee (example 23) or, in long-distance communication nā can indicate that the addressee is anticipated to be in a certain place at the time of reading the letter or story or answering the phone call during the long-distance communication (example 24).

Lā 'away from both speaker and addressee; intensifier' may only occur with a directional meaning in verb phrases, not in noun phrases. Lā often modifies motion verbs and can take on the directional meaning of 'there, yonder.' For example:

Demonstrative predicates 
In Pukapukan, demonstrative predicates take on a number of roles and functions.

Firstly, indefinite demonstrative pronouns can function as predicates which denote spatial or temporal location and are usually followed by their subjects as demonstrated in examples 7–10 above.

When denoting temporal location, demonstrative predicates may do this specifically (as in example 26) or indirectly (as in example 27).

In narratives, demonstrative predicates may be used to set the scene for an imminent event, such as:

They may also function as an affirmation seeker or used to describe or explain an aside in real time to listeners and readers.

In particular, eia can be used to set apart narrative clauses from backgrounding comments and is also used as a marker which concludes a narrative.

Lastly, demonstrative predicates do not allow topicalisation of their subjects.

Demonstrative adverbs 
Pukapukan has four demonstrative adverbs. These include pēnei ‘like this,’ pēnā ‘like that [by you],’ pēlā ‘like that [over there]’ and peia ‘like so [being demonstrated]’ can modify a predicate, function as verbs, denote modality, introduce direct or indirect speech or stand as a pro-form for a prepositional phrase. For example, peia functions as a verb meaning ‘carry on in like manner’ to the action or state described in a previous clause as seen in example 34 below.

Deictic distinctions 
This demonstrative paradigm below shows the four deictic patterns found in Pukapukan. 

Pattern 1 generally corresponds to ‘near speaker, or deictic centre.’ For example:

Pattern 2 generally corresponds to ‘near the addressee.’

Pattern 3 generally corresponds to ‘away from both speaker and addressee.’

Pattern 4 generally corresponds to ‘aforementioned or being demonstrated.’

Vocabulary

Indigenous vocabulary
 kāvatavata “noise made by snapping tongue”
 Pōiva “name of a deified ancestor”
 pulu “the calf of the leg”
 Yāmatangi “prayer for a fair wind”

Loanwords
Pukapukan is not closely related to other Cook Islands languages but it does show substantial borrowing from Eastern Polynesian languages, such as Rarotongan. In fact, because there is no ‘r’ in Pukapukan ‘l’ takes its place in Rarotongan borrowings (Teingoa 1993).

Homophones
Pukapukan uses many homophones in its vocabulary usually to give names to new words or items with similar origin meanings (Beaglehole 1906–1965).

kapa	
v. to clap hands in rhythm
v. to cry loudly
n. corner

ata
n. an emotional shock
n. shadow
n. Dawn
v. to change color
Verbal prefix: good at, skilled in

lulu
v. to tie up
n. Bundle, village, group, team
n. Name of a taro preparation
n. Name of a bird

Endangerment

Materials
There is a limited list when it comes to the language of Pukapukan. Although, today speakers of the language, locals of Pukapuka, and especially teachers on the island are working to put together books and resources dedicated to the teaching and structure of Pukapukan. Collaboratively the locals  of the island are also working to bring back to their own community since the devastating Cyclone Percy in 2005. Since 2005 it has taken nearly 6 years to rebuild their communities (Pasifika 2009). Currently there are a select number of manuscripts and dictionaries on the language of Pukapukan, but their culture is kept alive through music and dance collaborations across the pacific and websites like YouTube.

Vitality
According to Ethnologue Pukapukan is considered to be a threatened language and its “Intergenerational transmission is in the process of being broken, but the child-bearing generation can still use the language so it is possible that revitalization efforts could restore transmission of the language in the home. Speakers of Pukapukan especially children are multilingual in English and Cook Islands Maori, but English is rarely spoken outside of schools and many classes are actually taught in Pukapukan. Today, revitalization efforts of Pukapuka and its language is underway (Pasifika 2009).

Per the Te Reo Maori Act, Pukapukan is deemed to be a form of Cook Islands Māori for legal purposes.

Further reading
Teingo, W. A. (1993). Introduction to the Pukapukan Language. Hamilton, N.Z. : Outrigger Publishers Limited.
Beaglehole, Ernest & Pearl (1992). Pukapukan dictionary/ manuscript. [Auckland] : Pukapuka Dictionary Project, Dept. of Anthropology, University of Auckland.
Crystal, David (2002). Language Death. Cambridge: Cambridge University Press.
Unknown, T. P. [Tagata Pasifika]. (2009, 7 23). Pukapuka Cook Islands lack of population concerns Tagata Pasifika TVNZ New Zealand [Video file]. Retrieved from https://www.youtube.com/watch?v=wMPdKbqJiEo
Krauss, Michael. (1992). The world's languages in crisis. Language 68(1):4–10
Buse, Jasper (1995). Cook Islands Maori dictionary with English-Cook Islands Maori finderlist. Rarotonga, Cook Islands : Ministry of Education, Government of the Cook Islands ; London : School of Oriental and African Studies, University of London ; Suva, Fiji : Institute of Pacific Studies, University of the South Pacific ; [Auckland] : Centre for Pacific Studies, University of Auckland ; Canberra, ACT : Pacific Linguistics, Research School of Pacific and Asian Studies, Australian National University.
PAWLEY, Andrew 1966. “Polynesian Languages: A Subgrouping Based on Shared Innovations in Morphology.” Journal of the Polynesian Society, 75:39–64.

References

 UNESCO state of the language

PRD:predicate
CIA:‘passive’ suffix
DA:definitive accent
DIR:directional particle
G:goal marker
PRE:prefix
AF:aforementioned
R:monomoraic reduplication va-vayi
RR:bimoraic reduplication

Languages of the Cook Islands
Futunic languages
Pukapuka
Nassau (Cook Islands)
Endangered Austronesian languages